Ahmed Rizuvan (born 4 June 1995), nicknamed "Rizey", is a Maldivian footballer who is currently playing for Club Eagles.

International career 
Rizvan made his debut in an international friendly against Bangladesh on 1 September 2016, in which he replaced Ali Fasir in the 58th minute. Maldives went on to win the game by 5–0 at the National Football Stadium.

International goals

Under-19 

Scores and results list Maldives U–19's goal tally first.

See also 
 List of footballers who achieved hat-trick records

References

External links 
 Ahmed Rizvan at Maldivesoccer
 2016 most promising player at Maldives football awards

1995 births
Living people
Maldivian footballers
Maldives international footballers
Association football forwards
Club Eagles players